Dürnrohr is a village in Austria, which belongs to Zwentendorf, Lower Austria, Austria.

See also 
 Dürnrohr Power Station, a coal-fired power station close to Dürnrohr
 GK Dürnrohr, a decommissioned HVDC back-to-back station, which played before 1996 an important role in the transmission system of Europe
 Dürnrohr Waste Incineration Plant, a waste incineration plant close to Dürnrohr Power Station

Populated places in Lower Austria
Cadastral community of Tulln District